Optimalny Variant (Optimal Variant) is a Russian rock group.

It was formed in Moscow, Soviet Union, by Oleg Chilap (also known as O! Chilap, vocals and acoustic guitar), Alexander Lipnitsky (bass) and Pyotr Anikin (drums), with a purpose to "oppose the existed rock-movements in Moscow". The group was influenced by the music of The Beatles, poems of Alexander Blok and marxist theory. "Optimalny Variant" became famous after the performance of "Russians in Afghanistan" song in 1980.

The poetry of O! Chilap is full of original metaphors and kalamburs. His lyrics reflect a philosophical view of life, with man's inner freedom constituting the central idea. The group plays a synthesis of ballads and Russian melodies blended together on a blues basis.

Optimalny Variant was awarded by prizes at rock-festivals, included "Beatlomania" of 1989. They are organizing the "Apple Years Street" Yearly Festival.

Optimalny Variant was considered by Rossiyskaya Gazeta as the main successor of "post-Beatles period moods and harmonies" on Russian rock scene.

Selected discography
PoshliNa, 1988
Rizhiy albom, 1998
Legends of Russian Rock, 2003

Sources
Rock Music in the USSR, Moscow, 1990, p. 260-261

External links
Official Site
OV at Peoples.ru

Musical groups from Moscow
Russian rock music groups
Soviet rock music groups